Carl Wijk was a Swedish football manager. He was Malmö FF's first manager in Allsvenskan when he started managing the club.

References

Swedish footballers
Sweden international footballers
Swedish football managers
Malmö FF managers
Year of birth missing
Year of death missing

Association footballers not categorized by position